The Courts of Chaos is an album by the American heavy metal band Manilla Road, released in 1990. This is the last album before the band split up. They reunited in 2001.

Track listing
All songs written by Mark Shelton, Scott Park and Randy Foxe, except where noted.
 "Road to Chaos" - 4:44
 "Dig Me No Grave" - 4:21
 "D.O.A." - 7:02 (Bloodrock cover)
 "Into the Courts of Chaos" - 5:23
 "From Beyond" - 5:05
 "A Touch of Madness" - 7:03
 "(Vlad) The Impaler" - 3:27
 "The Prophecy" - 7:01
 "The Books of Skelos" - 8:08
"The Book of the Ancients"
"The Book of Shadows"
"The Book of Skulls"

Notes
Reissued in 2002 by Iron Glory Records with a bonus track:
10. Far Side of the Sun (Live) - originally appeared on the Roadkill live
album.

Credits
Manilla Road 
 Mark Shelton - vocals, guitar
 Scott Park - bass guitar
 Randy Foxe - drums, keyboards

Production
Manilla Road - producer 
Larry Funk - co-producer
Max Merhoff - co-producer

References

External links
Official Manilla Road site
The Courts of Chaos album details
The Courts of Chaos album details and review on Metal Storm

1990 albums
Manilla Road albums